Devon Markes Whyte (formerly and commonly known as Devon White, born December 29, 1962), nicknamed "Devo", is a Jamaican-born American former professional baseball center fielder, best known for his defensive ability at that position. He played in Major League Baseball (MLB) for the California Angels, Toronto Blue Jays, Florida Marlins, Arizona Diamondbacks, Los Angeles Dodgers, and Milwaukee Brewers. He currently serves as the first base coach for the Triple-A Buffalo Bisons, but was briefly called up to the Blue Jays as first base coach in 2022.

Early life
Born as Devon Whyte in Kingston, Jamaica, his family immigrated to the United States when he was nine years old. However, the paperwork had their family name misspelled as "White". His last name was legally changed back to its original spelling in 2003 at the behest of his children, but throughout his baseball playing career, he was known as "Devon White" and continues to sign autographs with that spelling. His daughter, Davellyn Whyte, played two seasons of professional basketball in the WNBA.

White attended Park West High School in Manhattan, New York City. White was primarily a basketball player in high school and only began playing baseball after watching New York Yankees and Mets games on television with his father. White received a scholarship offer to play both college basketball and college baseball for the Oklahoma State Cowboys.

Baseball career

California Angels
White was drafted by the California Angels in the 6th round of the 1981 draft. He made his major league debut in the late stages of the  season for California, but he did not establish himself as a major leaguer until , when he played a full season and hit with power and ran the basepaths with speed. In fact, he hit 24 home runs and stole 32 bases that season; he managed to steal at least fifteen bases and hit fifteen home runs before the All-Star break, and no rookie would do so again until 2022. In , only his second full season, he won his first of seven Gold Gloves.

On September 9, 1989, he became one of the few players in baseball history to get on first base then score by stealing second base, third base, and home.

Toronto Blue Jays
On December 2, he was traded with Willie Fraser and Marcus Moore to the Toronto Blue Jays for Junior Félix and Luis Sojo.

White won two World Series and five Gold Gloves with the Toronto Blue Jays. With a .336 batting average in his post-season career with the Blue Jays, compared to a .270 regular season average with Toronto, White consistently upped his game to help Toronto reach playoff success.

In 1992, White collected 3.9 Defensive Wins Above Replacement, which led the major leagues.

In Game 3 of the 1992 World Series against the Atlanta Braves, White was the central part of one of the most famous plays in World Series history. With David Justice batting and runners on first and second base, Justice hit a fly ball which White chased down and caught while jumping into the wall. White then threw the ball to second baseman Roberto Alomar who threw to John Olerud at first to try to double up Terry Pendleton, but Pendleton had already been called out for running past Deion Sanders. Olerud promptly threw the ball to third baseman Kelly Gruber who chased down Sanders, diving and clipping him on the heel with his glove. However the umpire, Bob Davidson, did not see the tag, and called Sanders safe, which cost the Jays the second triple play in World Series history. After the game, Davidson watched the replay and admitted he missed the call.

While playing for the team, White appeared on Canadian children's television show Under the Umbrella Tree, in uniform in what was then known as The Skydome talking with characters Jacob Bluejay and Iggy Iguana, in 1993 episode Baseball Fever.

Florida Marlins

Later years
On April 11, 2000, while leading off for the Dodgers as the first batter in the first game at Oracle Park (then called Pacific Bell Park) in San Francisco, White recorded the first base hit in the ballpark's history, off Giants pitcher Kirk Rueter.

Career statistics
In 1941 games over 17 seasons, White posted a .263 batting average (1934-for-7344) with 1125 runs, 378 doubles, 71 triples, 208 home runs, 846 RBI, 346 stolen bases, 541 bases on balls, .319 on-base percentage and .419 slugging percentage. He finished his career with a .986 fielding percentage playing at all three outfield positions. In 49 postseason games including three World Series, White batted .296 (56-for-189) with 27 runs, 12 doubles, 4 triples, 3 home runs, 20 RBI, 7 stolen bases and 19 walks.

Coaching career
In January 2017, White was hired by the Blue Jays organization to be the hitting coach of the Triple-A Buffalo Bisons.  In July 2022, White was called up to the Blue Jays as the interim first base coach for incumbent Mark Budzinski who was on bereavement leave.

Personal life
A cousin of White's, Jayden Hylton, also plays baseball.

See also
List of Major League Baseball career runs scored leaders

References

External links

1962 births
Living people
African-American baseball players
American expatriate baseball players in Canada
American League All-Stars
Arizona Diamondbacks players
California Angels players
Danville Suns players
Edmonton Trappers players
Florida Marlins players
Gold Glove Award winners
Idaho Falls Angels players
Jamaican emigrants to the United States
Los Angeles Dodgers players
Major League Baseball center fielders
Major League Baseball players from Jamaica
Midland Angels players
Milwaukee Brewers players
Nashua Angels players
National League All-Stars
Peoria Suns players
Redwood Pioneers players
San Bernardino Stampede players
Sportspeople from Kingston, Jamaica
Toronto Blue Jays players
21st-century African-American people
20th-century African-American sportspeople